Croatian inventions and discoveries are objects, processes or techniques invented or discovered, by people from Croatia.

References

External links
 Hrvatski izumitelji kroz povijest
 Croatia.eu - Inventions and inventors

 
Lists of inventions or discoveries
Inventions and discoveries